Acrocercops supplex is a moth of the family Gracillariidae. It is known from India (Bihar).

The larvae feed on Terminalia bellirica and Terminalia catappa. They probably mine the leaves of their host plant.

References

supplex
Moths described in 1918
Moths of Asia